The Marina Coastal Expressway (Abbreviation: MCE) is the tenth of Singapore's network of expressways. Construction for the MCE began in 2008 and was completed at the end of 2013. The expressway was officially opened on 28 December that year by Senior Minister of State Josephine Teo in the presence of Emeritus Senior Minister Goh Chok Tong, and was opened for vehicular traffic the next day.

Route
The 5-kilometre (3.1-mile) MCE connects with the southern  end of the KPE and its junction with the ECP to the eastern end of AYE. This links the eastern and western parts of Singapore to the New Downtown, currently being developed in the Marina Bay area. The MCE, with five lanes in each direction, handles the large number of commuters to be drawn to the offices, homes and recreational attractions there. It opens access to the Marina Bay Cruise Centre Singapore in Marina South and the existing Marina South Pier.

List of exits
{| class="wikitable"
! scope="col" | Exit
! scope="col" | Destinations
! scope="col" | Notes
|- style="background: #dff9f9"
| 1A
| Keppel Road, Ayer Rajah Expressway
| Expressway continues as Ayer Rajah Expressway
|- style="background: #ffdddd"
| 1B
| Shenton Way, Maxwell Road
| Westbound exit and eastbound entrance only
|-
| 2
| Central Boulevard, Marina Coastal Drive, Marina Gardens Drive, Rochor Road
| Signed as Exit 3 westbound
|- style="background: #dff9f9"
| 5
| Fort Road, East Coast Parkway (Changi Airport), Kallang–Paya Lebar Expressway
| Expressway continues as Kallang–Paya Lebar Expressway

History

Plans to extend the KPE to join the AYE began on 9 March 2006 to relieve congestion of the East Coast Parkway, and would be called Marina Coastal Expressway. Feasibility studies were conducted for the new expressway, and then Transport Minister Raymond Lim later announced on 27 July 2007 that approval had been given for the construction of a new 5 km long Marina Coastal Expressway (MCE) at a cost of $2.5 billion. The expressway, which includes Singapore's first undersea tunnel, links the East Coast Parkway and Kallang-Paya Lebar Expressway to Marina South and Ayer Rajah Expressway and opened to traffic on 29 December 2013.

The expressway comprises a  tunnel, while the rest are at grade or depressed, with a view of the Singapore Strait. This had posed particular engineering challenges in the tunnel construction as large amounts of water were let out from the barrage from time to time. At its deepest point, the expressway lies about  under the seabed.

On 28 April 2009, the Land Transport Authority revealed that it has awarded about S$4.1 billion worth of contracts, much more than the initial estimate of $2.5 billion. The construction of the MCE also required undersea dredging.

After the MCE was opened, the segment of the ECP between Central Boulevard and Benjamin Sheares Bridge was downgraded to become Sheares Avenue. The segment of the ECP between the AYE and Central Boulevard was permanently demolished.

The first few days of operations was plagued by heavy traffic congestion due to drivers' unfamiliarity with the expressway as well as connections with other roads and expressways. There was reportedly heavier than usual traffic, compared to using the old route via ECP, on 29 December 2013, the first day the MCE opened. The situation was exacerbated on the next day with the Monday morning peak hour traffic. However, the majority of drivers are aware of the road changes.

On 28 September 2014, with the road changes in Marina South area, the Prince Edward Road exit was removed and was replaced by Straits Boulevard exit with the ERP gantry being relocated from Prince Edward Road to Straits Boulevard.

References

External links

Expressways in Singapore
Road tunnels in Singapore
Kallang
Downtown Core (Singapore)
Marina East
Marina South
Straits View
Articles containing video clips
2013 establishments in Singapore